The Ambassador of Malaysia to the Kingdom of Sweden is the head of Malaysia's diplomatic mission to Sweden. The position has the rank and status of an Ambassador Extraordinary and Plenipotentiary and is based in the Embassy of Malaysia, Stockholm.

List of heads of mission

Ambassadors to Sweden

See also
 Malaysia–Sweden relations

References 

 
Sweden
Malaysia